The Bemba language is a major Bantu language spoken primarily in north-eastern Zambia.

Bemba language may also refer to:

A "Bemba" language now thought to be Buyu language

See also
Bembe language (Kibembe)
Bembe language (Ibembe)